Rhonda Nyman is an American politician who served in the Massachusetts House of Representatives from 2011 to 2015. She was elected as a Democrat in November 2010, succeeding her husband Robert Nyman who died in office. In the November 2014 election, she was defeated by Republican challenger David DeCoste in a close election, only conceding after the result was verified by a recount.

Notes

Living people
Democratic Party members of the Massachusetts House of Representatives
Women state legislators in Massachusetts
Year of birth missing (living people)
21st-century American women